Equestrian competitions were contested by participating nations at the 1983 Pan American Games.

Events

Medal table

See also 
 Equestrian at the 1984 Summer Olympics

References 
  .
 

Events at the 1983 Pan American Games
1983
1983 in equestrian
Equestrian sports competitions in Venezuela